PRLR can refer to:
 Power Rangers Lightspeed Rescue
 Prolactin receptor